The 1999 Commonwealth of Independent States Cup was the seventh edition of the competition between the champions of former republics of Soviet Union. It was won by Spartak Moscow for the fourth time.

Format change
Starting with this edition of the tournament, all participating nations were split into two divisions. Eight nations which were represented in 1998 Cup quarterfinals were included in the Top Division, while the other seven nations included in the First Division. This format lasted for three years (1999–2001), before being reverted to the previous format (used from 1996 till 1998). The change was implemented to reduce the number of non-competitive games between opponents with big strength gap, such as 1998 match between Spartak Moscow and Vakhsh Qurghonteppa, which was won by the Russian side with a record-setting score 19–0.

Top Division: In the First Round, eight participants are split into two groups (A and B). Nations, whose representatives finish last in their groups, are being relegated to the First Division for the next season. Two best-placed clubs from each group will advance to the Semifinal Round, with two games between the clubs advanced from the same group being carried over from the First Round. In the Semifinal Round, clubs will play two games against two teams which qualified from the opposing First Round group. Two best clubs of the Semifinal Round table advance to the Final match.
First Division: Seven nations of the First Division are split into two groups (C and D). Unofficial participant Russia U21 national team is added to one of the groups, but their games are not counted for the official table. Nations, whose representatives win their groups, are being promoted to the Top Division for the next season.

Participants

 1 FBK Kaunas replaced Žalgiris Vilnius (league's top team at the winter break), who withdrew after delegating most of its players to the national youth teams during tournament's time frame.
 2 Dinamo Tbilisi were represented by youth/reserve players.
 3 Tulevik Viljandi participated as a farm club of Flora Tallinn (1998 Estonian champions).
 4 Spartak-2 Moscow replaced  Pakhtakor Tashkent (1998 Uzbek champions), who withdrew along with other Uzbek teams.

First Division

Group C
Unofficial table

Official table

 Moldova promoted to the Top Division

Results

Group D
Unofficial table

Official table

 Armenia promoted to the Top Division

Results

Top Division

Group A

Georgia relegated to First Division

Results

Group B

Turkmenistan relegated to First Division

Results

Final rounds

Semifinal
 Two results carried over from the First Round: Dynamo v Skonto 4–3 and Spartak v Kaunas 2–0

Results

Final

Top scorers

References

External links
1999 CIS Cup at rsssf.com
1999 CIS Cup at football.by
1999 CIS Cup at kick-off.by

1999
1999 in Russian football
1998–99 in Ukrainian football
1998–99 in European football
January 1999 sports events in Russia
1999 in Moscow